Nanga Eboko (Nanga-Eboko) is a town and municipality, capital of the Haute-Sanaga (Upper Sanaga) department in the Centre Province of Cameroon. It lies on the Sanaga River and counts a population of 29,814, of which 18,282 in the town.

History

Geography
The town, located in the middle of Cameroon, lies between Yaoundé (172 km northeast), the national capital, and Bertoua (173 km east).

The municipality includes the town of Nanga Eboko itself and several villages:

Abam
Berkong
Bibassa
Biboa
Bifoulé
Bikaga
Bikang
Bissaga
Bitam
Biwong
Bogba
Boundjou
Déa
Dingbekoua
Eboulé
Efoulane II
Ekanga
Ekok
Ekondong
Emtsé
Essamesso
Etog-Nang
Ka'a
Kom
Lembé Badja
Mangaé
Mbenda
Mbiam
Mbomendjock
Mebolé
Mekak
Mekomo
Memia
Mendoumbé
Menga'a
Mengoa
Mengondé
Mengué
Messa'a
Messegué
Messibigui
Mevounga
Mewomé
Meyang
Meyosso
Mezassa
Mfomalène
Mgboum
Mimbang
Mimbelé
Mpandang
Mpomtené
Mvomzock
Nangmana
Ndandouck
Ndemba
Nding
Ndjassi
Ndjimekong
Ndjombé
Ngamba
Ngamba-Ndel
Ngoakomba
Ngoulmekong
Nkoambang
Nkolmveng
Nkondom
Nya Yessé
Okassang
Okolat
Ouassa-Bamvelé
Sandja
Sanga
Sassé
Zengoaga

Transport
Nanga Eboko has a railway station on the Camrail system, on the branch linking the national capital Yaoundé with Ngaoundéré. The station is located in the northern suburb of Nsimeyong. The town has also a local unpaved airfield, and is crossed by the national highway N1.

Popular culture
Eddie Murphy's character in Trading Places dons a thinly veiled disguise as an exchange student from Cameroon named "Nanga Eboko".

Notable people
Asseng Protais, playwright
Loïc Mbe Soh, Footballer

Gallery

See also
Communes of Cameroon
Rail transport in Cameroon

References

External links

Populated places in Centre Region (Cameroon)
Communes of Cameroon